Govardhan Kumari (popularly known as Rajmata sa, July 23, 1938 — January 9, 2013), is the only lady from the Royal Family known for her efforts to revive and promote the authentic style of Ghoomar, a folk dance form of Rajasthan.

Biography 
Govardhan Kumari heads the Gangaur Ghoomar Dance Academy , a Mumbai-based dance institution. Under the aegis of the academy, she has contributed to the participation of the students at various dance and cultural festivals, including the festival of ICCR in countries including USSR, Mauritius, Ghana, Nigeria, Morocco, Ivory Coast, Trinidad Tobago, USA, Venezuela,  UAE, Oman, Doha 2010, the Capital of Arab Culture, held at Qatar National Theater in September 2010. She made efforts to revive the Rajwadi tradition of Ghoomar dance and in popularizing Chari Dance of Kishangarh. The Government of India awarded her the fourth highest civilian Honour of the Padma Shri, in 2007, for her contributions to arts.

The Gangaur Ghoomar Dance Academy, is now being taken forward by her student and assistant, Mrs. Jyothi D. Tommaar, along with associate directors Dr. Pratiba Naitthani and Rajmata sa's daughter in law Maharani Mandakini Kumari of Santrampur, Gujarat.

See also 
 Ghoomar
 Chari Dance

References

External links 

Recipients of the Padma Shri in arts
People from Panchmahal district
Indian female dancers
Dancers from Gujarat
20th-century Indian dancers
21st-century Indian dancers
20th-century Indian women artists
21st-century Indian women artists
Women artists from Gujarat
Living people
1938 births